Tehatta Government Polytechnic,  now called Babasaheb Ambedkar Government Polytechnic is a new government polytechnic located in Tehatta, Betai ,  Nadia district, West Bengal.

About college
This polytechnic is affiliated to the West Bengal State Council of Technical Education,  and recognized by AICTE, New Delhi. This polytechnic offers diploma courses in Footwear Technology, Electrical, and Civil Engineering.

See also
List of institutions of higher education in West Bengal
Education in India
Education in West Bengal
All India Council for Technical Education

References

External links
Official website WBSCTE
Tehatta Government Polytechnic
 

Universities and colleges in Nadia district
Technical universities and colleges in West Bengal
Educational institutions established in 2016
2016 establishments in West Bengal